Hendrik "Rik" Schoofs (born 6 November 1950) is a Belgian long-distance runner. He competed in the marathon at the 1976 Summer Olympics and the 1980 Summer Olympics.

References

External links
 

1950 births
Living people
Athletes (track and field) at the 1976 Summer Olympics
Athletes (track and field) at the 1980 Summer Olympics
Belgian male long-distance runners
Belgian male marathon runners
Olympic athletes of Belgium
People from Borgloon
Sportspeople from Limburg (Belgium)
20th-century Belgian people